The Women's 1.5 kilometre sprint competition of the 2022 Winter Paralympics was held at the National Biathlon Center in Beijing on 9 March 2022.

Medal table

1.5 km sprint visually impaired
In the cross-country skiing visually impaired, the athlete with a visual impairment has a sighted guide. The two skiers are considered a team, and dual medals are awarded.

Qualifications

Semifinal 1

Semifinal 2

Final

1.5 km sprint standing

Qualifications

Semifinal 1

Semifinal 2

Final

1.5 km sprint sitting

Qualifications

Semifinal 1

Semifinal 2

Final

See also
Cross-country skiing at the 2022 Winter Olympics

References

Women's 1.5 km sprint classical